Yaya Diallo may refer to:

Yaya Diallo, a Malian drummer.
Yaya Diallo (cyclist), Malian cyclist.
Alpha Yaya Diallo (artist), guitarist and composer now based in Vancouver, Canada
Alpha Yaya Diallo (politician), current member of the CNDD Military junta in Guinea